The 2014 Louisiana–Monroe Warhawks baseball team represents the University of Louisiana at Monroe in the 2014 NCAA Division I baseball season. The Warhawks play their home games in Warhawk Field.

Personnel

Returning starters

Roster

Schedule and results

Rankings

References

Louisiana-Monroe
Louisiana–Monroe Warhawks baseball seasons
Louisiana-Monroe Warhawks baseball team